Eucalyptus capitellata, commonly known as brown stringybark, is a species of tree that is endemic to New South Wales. It is a small to medium-sized tree with rough, stringy bark from the trunk to the thinnest branches, lance-shaped to curved adult leaves, spindle-shaped or oblong flower buds in groups of seven or more, white flowers and clusters of flattened hemispherical fruit.

Description
The bark is rough, stringy, grey to brownish and extends from the trunk to the smaller branches. Flowering mainly occurs between December and February and the flowers are white.

Taxonomy
Eucalyptus capitellata was first formally described in 1795 by James Edward Smith in his book, A Specimen of the Botany of New Holland. Smith noted that a drawing of the fruit of this species had previously been published on page 226 of the book by First Fleet surgeon and naturalist John White, Journal of a Voyage to New South Wales but incorrectly ascribed to Eucalyptus piperita.

The specific epithet (capitellata) is a Latin word meaning "with a little head", possibly referring to the clusters of fruit.

Distribution and habitat
Brown stringybark grows in open forest or woodland, usually in poor, sandy soil in coastal areas between Karuah and Nerriga in New South Wales.

References

capitellata
Flora of New South Wales
Myrtales of Australia
Trees of Australia
Plants described in 1795
Taxa named by James Edward Smith